The use of terms and images referring to Native Americans/First Nations as the name or mascot for a sports team is a topic of public controversy in the United States and in Canada. The documents most often cited to justify the trend for change are an advisory opinion by the United States Commission on Civil Rights in 2001 and a resolution by the American Psychological Association in 2005. Both support the views of Native American organizations and individuals that such mascots maintain harmful stereotypes that are discriminatory and cause harm by distorting the past and preventing understanding of Native American/First Nations peoples in the present. Such practices are seen as particularly harmful in schools and universities, which have the a stated purpose of promoting ethnic diversity and inclusion. This view lead to the NCAA adopting a policy to eliminate "hostile and abusive" names and mascots. However some changes began in the 1970s in response to the Native American civil rights movement, led by the National Congress of American Indians.

Defenders of the current usage often state their intention to honor Native Americans by referring to positive traits, such as fighting spirit and being aggressive, brave, stoic, dedicated, and proud; while opponents see these traits as being based upon stereotypes of Native Americans as savages. Supporters also claim that the issue is not important, being only about sports, and that the opposition is nothing more than "political correctness", which change advocates argue ignores the extensive evidence of harmful effects of stereotypes and bias.

Canada
The Department of Educational Foundations at the University of Saskatchewan passed a resolution calling for the retirement of all school mascots and logos that depict First Nations people.

There was debate at McGill University in the 2010s over the use of the name "Redmen" for men's varsity sports teams, which alumni say originated as a reference to the school colors and the Celtic heritage of its founder before late becoming associated with First Nation's names and imagery which were removed from use in the 1990s. (The women's teams, though by the 2010s long since re-dubbed "Marlets", had previously been known as the "Squaws".) Others, including indigenous students and Washington State University professor C. Richard King, argue that the name itself is generally used as a disparaging term for indigenous peoples, reinforcing stereotypes and white settler culture. McGill principal and vice chancellor Suzanne Fortier announced that the university would refer to its men's teams as "the McGill teams" during the 2019–20 academic year while deciding on a new name. Since 2020–21, McGill men's teams have been known as the "Redbirds", while women's sports programs continue to use the name "Martlets", which was not the subject of controversy.

Seneca College in Toronto, Ontario changed from the Braves to "The Sting" in 2000.

United States

NCAA policy

In 2005 the National Collegiate Athletic Association (NCAA) distributed a "self evaluation" to 31 colleges for teams to examine the use of potentially offensive imagery with their mascot choice. Subsequently, 19 teams were cited as having potentially "hostile or abusive" names, mascots, or images, that would be banned from displaying them during post-season play, and prohibited from hosting tournaments.

Schools that removed all references to Native American culture or were deemed not to have references to Native American culture as part of their athletics programs: 
 Alcorn State University – Lorman, Mississippi (Braves) - Logo is a large A, mascot is the "Bravehawk".
 Lycoming College (Warriors)
 Eastern Connecticut State University (Warriors)
 East Stroudsburg University of Pennsylvania (Warriors)
 Merrimack College (Warriors)
 University of North Carolina at Pembroke (Braves) – originally created to educate American Indians, and since its creation has had close ties to the local Lumbee tribe 
 University of Hawaii at Manoa – (Hawaii Rainbow Warriors and Rainbow Wahine) From 2000 through 2013, each team was allowed to select its own nickname; most notably, the football team was simply known as "The Warriors". In 2013, the school adopted the identity of "Rainbow Warriors" for all men's teams, while women's teams remain "Rainbow Wahine".
 Wisconsin Lutheran College (Warriors)

Schools granted waivers to retain their nicknames after gaining support from those respective tribes:
 Catawba College - Salisbury, North Carolina (Catawba Indians)
 Central Michigan University – Mount Pleasant, Michigan (Chippewas)
 Florida State University – Tallahassee, Florida (Seminoles) - the mascot is Osceola and Renegade and FSU originated the Tomahawk chop performed by fans at games. 
 Mississippi College – Clinton, Mississippi (Choctaws)
 University of Utah – Salt Lake City, Utah (Utes) Prior to 1972, the Utah teams had informally been known as the Redskins as well as the Utes.

The NCAA did not cite San Diego State University, San Diego, California as "hostile and abusive" due to the Aztec people having no modern representatives. A SDSU professor of American Indian Studies states that the mascot teaches the mistaken idea that Aztecs were a local tribe rather than living in Mexico 1,000 miles from San Diego. In April 2017, the university's Associated Students council rejected a resolution to retire the mascot introduced by the Native American Student Association. In May 2021, the  San Diego State University Senate passed a resolution to replace the Aztec Warrior mascot image and to create an advisory council to choose a new mascot consistent with local Kumeyaay traditional narratives.

Other current usage (non-NCAA)

 Bacone College – Muskogee, Oklahoma (Warriors) was founded as a Cherokee Baptist Mission school and retains a connection to several tribes.
 Cochise College, Douglas, Arizona (Apaches) - Community College
 Lewis–Clark State College, Lewiston, Idaho (Warriors) - Logo features Lewis and Clark, use of Warriors nickname deemed respectful by Tribal leaders.
 Ottawa University – Ottawa, Kansas (Braves)
 Tyler Junior College, Tyler, Texas (Apaches)

Prior usage
 Carlisle Indians, a school for American Indians that was a college football power in the early 1900s
 Chowan University – Murfreesboro, North Carolina (Braves)
 University of Oklahoma mascot: Little Red

See also
 List of indigenous peoples
 List of contemporary ethnic groups

References

Cultural appropriation
Native Americans in popular culture
Lists of mascots
Lists of names
Lists of sports teams
Sports mascots
College football controversies
Native American-related lists